Portarlington may refer to:

Places
Portarlington, County Laois, on the border between County Laois and County Offaly, Ireland
Portarlington railway station
Portarlington (Parliament of Ireland constituency), a constituency until 1801 in Ireland
Portarlington (UK Parliament constituency), 1801-1885
 Portarlington GAA, a Gaelic football club
Portarlington RFC, a rugby union club
Portarlington, Victoria, Australia
Portarlington Football Club, an Australian rules football club

People
 Earl of Portarlington, a title in the Peerage of Ireland
 John Dawson, 2nd Earl of Portarlington (1781-1845), British Army officer
 Henry Dawson-Damer, 3rd Earl of Portarlington (1822-1889), Irish peer
 Lionel Dawson-Damer, 4th Earl of Portarlington (1832-1892), British politician
 Aidan Howlin, 5th Earl of Portarlington (1864-1920), British barrister

See also